In organic chemistry, dehalogenation is a set of chemical reactions that involve the cleavage of carbon-halogen bonds; as such, it is the inverse reaction of halogenation. Dehalogenations come in many varieties, including defluorination (removal of fluorine), dechlorination (removal of chlorine), debromination (removal of bromine), and deiodination (removal of iodine). Incentives to investigate dehalogenations include both constructive and destructive goals. Complicated organic compounds such as pharmaceutical drugs are occasionally generated by dehalogenation.  Many organohalides are hazardous, so their dehalogenation is one route for their detoxification.

Pathways
Removal of one halogen atom from an organohalides generates highly reactive radicals. This fact has multiple consequences:
monodehalogenation is usually accompanied by coupling of the resulting radical:
2 R-X   +  2 Li  ->  R-R  + 2LiX
when a pair of halides are mutually adjacent (vicinal), their removal favored.  Vicinal alkyl dihalides convert to alkenes.  Magnesium can be used:
R2C(X)C(X)R2 +  Mg -> R2C=CR2 +  MgX2
dehalogenations can be effected by hydrogenolysis, the replacement of a  bond by a  bond. Such reactions are amenable to catalysis:
R-X  +  H2 -> R-H  + H-X

Fluoride vs chloride vs bromide vs iodide
The rate of dehalogenation depends on the bond strength between the carbon and halogen atom. Thus, for the same structures the bond dissociation rate for dehalogenation will be: . Additionally, the rate of dehalogenation for alkyl halide also varies with steric environment and follows this trend:   halides.

Applications

Since organochlorine compounds are the most abundant organohalides, most dehalogenations entail manipulation of C-Cl bonds.

Alkali and alkaline earth metals
Highly electropositive metals react with many organic halides in a metal-halogen exchange:
R-X  +  2 M  ->  R-M  +  M-X
The resulting organometallic compound is susceptible to hydrolysis:
R-M  +  H2O  ->  R-H  +  M-OH
Heavily studied examples are found in organolithium chemistry and organomagnesium chemistry.  Some illustrative cases follow.

Lithium-halogen exchange provides one trivial route to dehalogenation. Sodium metal has been used for dehalogenation process.
Removal of halogen atom from arene-halides in the presence of Grignard agent and water for the formation of new compound is known as Grignard degradation. Dehalogenation using Grignard reagents is a two steps hydrodehalogenation process. The reaction begins with the formation of alkyl/arene-magnesium-halogen compound, followed by addition of proton source to form dehalogenated product. Egorov and his co-workers have reported dehalogenation of benzyl halides using atomic magnesium in 3P state at 600°C. Toluene and bi-benzyls were produced as the product of the reaction. Morrison and his co-workers also reported dehalogenation of organic halides by flash vacuum pyrolysis using magnesium.

With transition metal complexes
Many low-valent and electron-rich transition metals effect stoichiometric dehalogenation.  The reaction achieves practical interest in the context of organic synthesis, e.g. Cu-promoted Ullmann coupling.  

Examples can be found with vanadium, chromium, manganese, and iron and cobalt. Vitamin B12 and coenzyme F430 were capable of sequentially dechlorinating tetrachloroethene to ethene, while hematin was demonstrated to dechlorinate tetrachloroethene to vinyl chloride.

Jayant and his coworkers developed two phase systems for dehalogenation of trichloroethenes. The kinetic model provides reaction process to take place in one phase while mass transfer between two phases.

Further reading
Gotpagar, J.; Grulke, E.; Bhattacharyya, D.; Reductive dehalogenation of trichloroethylene: kinetic models and *Hetflejš, J.; Czakkoova, M.; Rericha, R.; Vcelak, J. Catalyzed dehalogenation of delor 103 by sodium hydridoaluminate. Chemosphere 2001, 44, 1521.
Kagoshima, H.; Hashimoto, Y.; Oguro, D.; Kutsuna, T.; Saigo, K. Trophenylphosphine/germanium (IV) chloride combination: A new agent for the reduction of α-bromo carboxylic acid derivatives. Tetrahedron, 1998, 39, 1203-1206

References

Halogenation reactions
Organic reactions
Inorganic reactions
Halogens